José Julián Herculano del Casal y de la Lastra (November 7, 1863 – October 21, 1893) was a poet from Havana, Cuba. He started his writing career at a young age and later in life was known as an important forebearer of modernistic expression in Latin America.

He took his influence from the French poetic styles of the day and later, Rubén Darío and Modernismo.

Early life 
Casal was born in Havana, Cuba. The family of Julián del Casal was not wealthy, but they lived comfortably. His mother, a Cuban native named Maria del Carmen de la Lastra y Owens, died in 1868 when Casal was four years old. He was raised by his father, a Spaniard known as Julián del Casal y Ugareda, who died later in 1885 when Casal was twenty-two years old. 
Casal was born into a Catholic family and was baptized on December 23 at two months old, in La iglesia del Santo Angel Custodio, by his godparents Don José de la Lastra and Doña Matilde de la Lastra y Owens.

Education 

In 1870, Julián del Casal began his education at a very formal school named El Real Colegio de Belén. He graduated with his bachelor's degree in 1880. After graduating from El Real Colegio de Belén he decided to enroll in the Havana University School of Law. He started in 1881 but he did not stay there long and was forced to drop out because of family monetary issues. After he dropped out he pursued his writing career and began working as a finance minister.

Career 
At the early age of fourteen, Casal began his own newspaper press with a fellow high school alumna, Arturo Mora. They titled their newspaper El Estudiante, periódico clandestino y manuscrito. After he graduated high school, he published his first work in a science, arts and literature weekly journal. Casal titled the poem El Ensayo and it was the first publication from a poet to be seen in a Cuban press. In this same year, he also began working as a clerk at El Ministerio de Hacienda (The Treasury Department). His writing career began to pick up when in 1885, Casal began publishing works in La Habana Elegante, a Cuban magazine that acted as a medium for the Modernist movement of that time. In 1888, he began working with El Figaro as well. Later that year, he traveled to Madrid, Spain. In 1889 Casal returned to his homeland of Cuba where he started to assist with meetings with the Galeria Literaria. In 1890 he published his first book which he named Hojas al Viento and helped to edit La Discusiónn  The following year he started working with La Habana Literaria. His second book Nieve was published in 1892; the same year he met Ruben Dario and when Dario dedicated El Clavicordio de la Abuela to Casal. In 1893 he had a lot of contact with Dario including an article he wrote about Dario and a letter that Casal sent to Dario towards the end of his life.

Major works 

Casal only published two poetry collections during his lifetime, Hojas al viento and Nieve. His last collection, Bustos y rimas was never completed while he was alive, however it appeared in 1893 shortly after his death with the help of Casal's friend, Enrique Hernández Miyares. It differs from his earlier works because it contains both prose and poetry. Hojas al viento includes forty-nine poems and is considered an example of Casal's early writing style. The poems in this collection are topical in nature and often refer to contemporary events. A few of them were even characterized as "imitations" and show the influence of other writers. The work was well received by his contemporaries as an early offering by a poet with much promise.

Casal continued to publish poems in various Cuban periodicals and in 1892 he compiled many of these pieces in his second collection, Nieve. Divided into five sections, the poems in this collection are categorized according to theme. The first section, Bocetos antiguos, includes poems inspired by pagan and Judeo-Christian thought; the second section, Mi museo ideal, is famous because the poems contained in it were inspired by the art of Gustave Moreau, with whom Julián had an ongoing correspondence with. The third section, Cromos españoles, is a collection of well-known Spanish word pictures. The fourth, Marfiles viejos, contains sixteen sonnets that all reflect his fears and concerns about life in general. The fifth and final section titled La gruta del ensueño, completes the collection with seventeen miscellaneous poems. Nieve was met with some critical success, although most contemporaries in Cuba felt that Julián del Casal's themes were too dark and pessimistic.

Later life 

Julián del Casal continued publishing works up until his death in October 1893. Earlier that year, he wrote an article about his colleague Rubén Darío, the famous father of Modernism, in the Cuban magazine La Habana Elegante. Casal also began writing his final book Bustos y Rimas. Before his death, Casal wrote a letter to Rubén Darío in which he talked about premonitions he was having about death. Not too long after this, Casal was at a colleague's home when he suffered a hemorrhage during conversation after dinner. He died due to this and was buried in his family pantheon. His final book, Bustos y Rimas was finished by his colleague and friend Enrique Hernández Miyares and published shortly after Casal's death.

References

External links
 Julián del Casal Criticism
 Julián del Casal author profile
 

1863 births
1893 deaths
19th-century Cuban poets
Cuban male poets
Modernismo
19th-century male writers